Aziz Dadas (born 16 May 1968 in Casablanca) is a Moroccan actor. He is known for starring alongside comedian Saïd Naciri, working with him in a number of acts such as The Rebbe, Al-Aouni, Playing with Wolves, The Hook, and for appearing in the successful Moroccan series Hour in Hell which aired on Al Aoula Channel. However, when he participated in the Moroccan comedy film The Way to Kabul, he was aired. He also appeared on the series Hdidan in Gueliz in 2017.

Work

Movies 

 Play with wolves (2004)
 Pair of balls (2008)
 The hook (2010)
 Road to Kabul (2012)
 The Zero (2012)
 Wolves that don't sleep (2014)
 Olive Riad (2015)
 Midnight Orchestra (2015)
 Green March (2016)
 Dalas (2016)
 The sneeze (2016)
 serpent (2017)
 My Uncle (2017)
 in Wonderland (2017)
 A cry from another world (2018)
 Catharsys or The Afina Tales of the Lost World (2018) (2019)
 Masoud Saida and Saadan (2020)

Series 

 The stepson
 Al Aouni
 An Hour in Hell
 Hdidan in Gueliz
 Never Mind (series)
 Ouchan
 Ali Boys (series)
 Hdidan at the Pharaohs
 The Past Doesn't die
 Hami Wlad Aami
 Country Side (Serie)

Programmes 

 Rachid Show (Guest)
 I have something to help (Guest)
 Face à Face (Guest)
 FBM (Guest)

References

External links 

 

Moroccan male television actors
Moroccan male film actors
Living people
All stub articles
1968 births